The 2017–18 Azadegan League was the 27th season of the Azadegan League and 17th as the second highest division since its establishment in 1991. The season featured 13 teams from the 2016–17 Azadegan League, two new teams relegated from the 2016–17 Persian Gulf Pro League: Saba Qom and Machine Sazi and three new teams promoted from the 2016–17 League 2: Shahrdari Tabriz and Shahrdari Mahshahr both as champions and Bargh Jadid Shiraz. The league started on 7 August 2017 and ended on 29 April 2018. Naft Masjed Soleyman won the Azadegan League title for the first time in their history. Naft Masjed Soleyman and Nassaji Mazandaran promoted to the Persian Gulf Pro League.

Teams

Stadia and locations

Number of teams by region

League table

Results

Clubs season-progress

Statistics

Top scorers

Notes:Updated to games played on 29 March 2018. Source: dsport.ir

Attendances

Average home attendances

Attendances by round

Notes:Updated to games played on 29 April 2018. Source: lig1.ir  Matches with spectator bans are not included in average attendances  Baadraan Tehran played their match against Shahrdari Tabriz at Shohada Shahr-e Qods  Bargh Jadid Shiraz played their matches against Gol Gohar, Iranjavan, Khooneh be Khooneh, Machine Sazi, Malavan, Mes Kerman, Mes Rafsanjan, Nassaji and Shahrdari Mahshahr at Shahid Dastgheib  Fajr Sepasi played their matches against Aluminium Arak, Bargh Jadid Shiraz, Khooneh be Khooneh, Machine Sazi, Mes Kerman, Naft MIS, Nassaji, Oxin Alborz, Shahrdari Mahshahr and Shahrdari Tabriz at Shahid Dastgheib  Gol Gohar played their matches against Aluminium Arak, Fajr Sepasi, Khooneh be Khooneh, Malavan, Naft MIS, Saba Qom and Shahrdari Mahshahr at Imam Ali  Gol Gohar played their matches against Mes Kerman, Nassaji and Shahrdari Tabriz at Bandar Abbas  Machine Sazi played their match against Fajr Sepasi at Sahand  Rah Ahan played their match against Khooneh be Khooneh at Kargaran  Rah Ahan played their match against Nassaji at Takhti Tehran  Saba Qom played their matches against Bargh Jadid Shiraz, Iranjavan, Mes Kerman, Nassaji and Rah Ahan at Shahid Heydariyan  Mes Kerman played their match against Rah Ahan at Sirjan  Shahrdari Tabriz played their matches against Bargh Jadid Shiraz, Fajr Sepasi, Iranjavan, Malavan, Mes Rafsanjan, Nassaji and Shahrdari Mahshahr at Shahid Tavana sports complex

Highest attendances

Notes:Updated to games played on 29 April 2018. Source: lig1.ir

See also
 2017–18 Persian Gulf Pro League
 2017–18 League 2
 2017–18 League 3
 2017–18 Hazfi Cup
 2017 Iranian Super Cup

References

Azadegan League seasons
Iran
2017–18 in Iranian football leagues